Ventoy is a free and open-source utility used for writing image files such as .iso, .wim, .img, .vhd(x), and  files onto storage media to create bootable USB flash drives. Once Ventoy is installed onto a USB drive, there is no need to reformat the disk to update it with new installation files; it is enough to copy the .iso, or  file(s) to the USB drive and boot from them directly. Ventoy will present the user with a boot menu to select one of these files.

Features 
Ventoy can be installed on a USB flash drive, local disk, SSD (NVMe), or SD Card and it will directly boot from the selected .iso, or  file(s) added. Ventoy does not extract the image file(s) to the USB drive, but uses them directly. It is possible to place multiple ISO images on a single device and select the image to boot from the menu displayed just after Ventoy boots.

MBR and GPT partition styles, x86 Legacy BIOS and various UEFI boot methods (including persistence) are supported. ISO files larger than 4 GB can be used. Ventoy supports various operating system boot and installation ISO files including Windows 7 and above, Debian, Ubuntu, CentOS, RHEL, Deepin, Fedora and more than a hundred other Linux distributions; various UNIX releases, VMware, Citrix XenServer, etc. have also been tested.

See also
List of tools to create Live USB systems

References

External links 

Github Repository
Softpedia: Ventoy
Linux Uprising Blog on Ventoy

Cross-platform software
Free system software
Linux installation software
Multiboot live USB